Old Greencastle Historic District is a national historic district in Greencastle, Putnam County, Indiana. The district encompasses 79 contributing buildings in a predominantly residential section of Greencastle. The district developed between about 1826 and 1961 and includes notable examples of Federal, Greek Revival,  Italianate, Stick Style, Prairie School, and Bungalow / American Craftsman-style architecture. Notable buildings include the Davidson House (c. 1826) and Gillespie-Lynch House (1830).

It was added to the National Register of Historic Places in 2011.

References

Historic districts on the National Register of Historic Places in Indiana
Greek Revival architecture in Indiana
Federal architecture in Indiana
Italianate architecture in Indiana
Bungalow architecture in Indiana
Historic districts in Putnam County, Indiana
National Register of Historic Places in Putnam County, Indiana